Ngọc Lặc is a township and capital of Ngọc Lặc District, Thanh Hóa Province, Vietnam.

References

Populated places in Thanh Hóa province
District capitals in Vietnam
Townships in Vietnam